Powhatan Ellis (January 17, 1790 – March 18, 1863) was a justice of the Mississippi Supreme Court, United States senator from Mississippi, and a United States district judge of the United States District Court for the District of Mississippi.

Education and career

Born on January 17, 1790, at Red Hill Farm in Amherst County, Virginia, Ellis graduated from Washington Academy (now Washington and Lee University) in 1809, received an Artium Baccalaureus degree in 1810 from Dickinson College and graduated from the College of William & Mary in 1814, where he studied law. He was admitted to the bar and entered private practice in Lynchburg, Virginia from 1813 to 1814 and from 1815 to 1816. He was a lieutenant in the Prevost Guards of Virginia in 1814. He resumed private practice in Natchez, Mississippi Territory in 1816. He continued private practice in Winchester, Mississippi Territory (State of Mississippi from December 10, 1817) from 1816 to 1817. He was a justice of the Mississippi Supreme Court from 1817 to 1818 and from 1818 to 1825.

Congressional service

Ellis was appointed as a Jacksonian Democrat to the United States Senate from Mississippi to fill the vacancy caused by the resignation of United States Senator David Holmes and served from September 28, 1825, to January 28, 1826, when a successor was elected and qualified. He was an unsuccessful candidate for election to fill the vacancy. He was elected as a Jacksonian Democrat to the United States Senate and served from March 4, 1827, to July 16, 1832, resigning to accept a judicial position.

Federal judicial service

Ellis was nominated by President Andrew Jackson on July 13, 1832, to a seat on the United States District Court for the District of Mississippi vacated by Judge Peter Randolph. He was confirmed by the United States Senate on July 14, 1832, and received his commission the same day. His service terminated on January 5, 1836, when he resigned.

Later career and death

Ellis was appointed charge d'affaires to Mexico for the United States Department of State by President Jackson, serving from January 1836 to December 1836 when he closed the legation.  He was appointed Envoy Extraordinary and Minister Plenipotentiary to Mexico for the United States Department of State by President Martin Van Buren, serving from February 1839 to April 1842. He resumed private practice in Natchez starting in 1842 and continued private practice in Richmond, Virginia until 1863. He died on March 18, 1863, in Richmond. He was interred in Shockoe Hill Cemetery in Richmond.

Heritage and family

One account in The Green Bag stated that Ellis was a descendant of Pocahontas. In 1833, he married Eliza Rebecca Winn who died in the spring of 1835. Together, they had two children.

Legacy

The city of Ellisville, Mississippi is named in Ellis's memory.

See also
List of justices of the Supreme Court of Mississippi

References

1790 births
1863 deaths
People from Amherst County, Virginia
American people of English descent
Mississippi Jacksonians
Jacksonian United States senators from Mississippi
Ambassadors of the United States to Mexico
Justices of the Mississippi Supreme Court
Judges of the United States District Court for the District of Mississippi
United States federal judges appointed by Andrew Jackson
19th-century American judges
19th-century American diplomats
People from Lynchburg, Virginia
Washington and Lee University alumni
Dickinson College alumni
William & Mary Law School alumni